Martin Ravallion (19 March 1952 – 24 December 2022) was an Australian economist. He was the inaugural Edmond D. Villani Professor of Economics at Georgetown University, and had previously been director of the research department at the World Bank. He held a PhD in economics from the London School of Economics.

Life and career
Ravallion researched extensively on poverty in developing countries and on policies for fighting poverty. In 1990 he proposed what has come to be known as the "$1 a day" poverty line, and since then he and his colleagues at the World Bank monitored progress against global poverty by this and other measures. A paper he wrote in 2012 became the basis of the World Bank, and subsequently United Nations, development goal of eliminating extreme poverty in the world by 2030. He advised numerous governments and international agencies, and wrote five books and 250 papers in scholarly journals, as well as editing several volumes. His book The Economics of Poverty: History, Measurement, and Policy was published by Oxford University Press in January 2016.

Based on publications and citations, Ravallion is regularly ranked in the top 10 development economists in the world and was ranked  number 1 globally in the field of Development Economics by RePEc/IDEAS. He is ranked in the top 100 economists in all fields.
He was a research associate of the National Bureau of Economic Research, a senior fellow of the Bureau for Research in Economic Analysis of Development, a non-resident fellow of the Center for Global Development, and ex-president of the society for the Study of Economic Inequality. In 2011 he received the John Kenneth Galbraith Award from the American Agricultural and Applied Economics Association. He won the 2015 BBVA Foundation Frontiers of Knowledge Award in Development Cooperation for his groundbreaking work on defining the extreme poverty threshold with internationally applicable standards that facilitate the establishment of specific development cooperation goals. In 2018 he was awarded an honorary doctorate in economics from the University of Fribourg, Switzerland.

Ravallion died on 24 December 2022, at the age of 70.

Selected bibliography

Books

Chapters in books

References

External links
Georgetown University profile
Economics & Poverty - Martin Ravallion's Website on the Economics of Poverty

1952 births
2022 deaths
Australian economists
Center for Global Development
Development economists
Georgetown University faculty
World Bank Chief Economists
World Bank people